Tallinn Indoor Meeting is an annual athletics meeting held at the Lasnamäe Indoor Arena in Tallinn, Estonia. The event is part of the World Athletics Combined Events Tour (Silver Level) from 2022 and previously one of the EA Indoor Permit Meetings.

World records

Winners

References

External links
Meeting website (EKJL)
Meeting website (EAA)

International sports competitions hosted by Estonia
Annual indoor track and field meetings
Sports competitions in Tallinn